The Reggiane Re.2003 was a development from the Reggiane Re.2002 fighter bomber that first flew on 29 June 1941. It was designed to replace the outdated IMAM Ro.37 used at the time. Unlike the Reggaine Re.2002, it had room for a second crewman who sat behind the pilot. It was equipped with onboard camera equipment. The Fiat A.74 RC.38 engine was intended to be used originally, but the Piaggio P. XI RC 40 Bis was chosen instead. Only one was ever produced, and production for a second started, but never finished. The Regia Aeronautica (Italian Air Force) made an order of 200, but cancelled the order as Allied bombing raids made the Air Force's focus switch to fighter aircraft.

Specifications

See also 
 North American T-6 Texan

Related Development
 Reggiane Re.2000
 Reggiane Re.2001
 Reggiane Re.2002
 Reggiane Re.2004
 Reggiane Re.2005
 Reggiane Re.2006
 Reggiane Re.2007

References

Bibliography

External links

1930s Italian military reconnaissance aircraft
Single-engined tractor aircraft
Aircraft first flown in 1941